Below is the list of populated places in Kastamonu Province, Turkey by the districts. In the following lists first place in each list is the administrative center of the district.

Kastamonu
 Kastamonu
 Ahlat, Kastamonu
 Ahlatçık, Kastamonu		
 Ahmetbey, Kastamonu		
 Akçakese, Kastamonu		
 Akçataş, Kastamonu		
 Akdoğan, Kastamonu		
 Aksinir, Kastamonu		
 Alçucular, Kastamonu
 Alpağut, Kastamonu		
 Alparslan, Kastamonu		
 Alpı, Kastamonu		
 Arız, Kastamonu		
 Aşağıakça, Kastamonu		
 Aşağıbatak, Kastamonu		
 Aşağıelyakut, Kastamonu		
 Aşağıyuva, Kastamonu		
 Ayvalar, Kastamonu		
 Bahadır, Kastamonu		
 Ballık, Kastamonu		
 Baltacı, Kastamonu		
 Baltacıkuyucağı, Kastamonu		
 Başköy, Kastamonu		
 Başören, Kastamonu		
 Bayındır, Kastamonu		
 Bostan, Kastamonu
 Bozoğlak, Kastamonu		
 Budamış, Kastamonu		
 Bulacık, Kastamonu		
 Burhanlı, Kastamonu		
 Bük, Kastamonu
 Bürme, Kastamonu		
 Canbaz, Kastamonu
 Çavundur, Kastamonu		
 Çavundur-Kuzkaya, Kastamonu
 Cebeci, Kastamonu		
 Civciler, Kastamonu		
 Çakıllı, Kastamonu		
 Çatalçam, Kastamonu		
 Çatören, Kastamonu		
 Çerçi, Kastamonu
 Çevreli, Kastamonu		
 Çıban, Kastamonu
 Çiğil, Kastamonu		
 Çorumlu, Kastamonu		
 Damlaçay, Kastamonu		
 Darıbükü, Kastamonu		
 Dayılar, Kastamonu		
 Demirci, Kastamonu		
 Dere, Kastamonu
 Dereberçin, Kastamonu		
 Dokuzkat, Kastamonu		
 Dursunlar, Kastamonu		
 Duruçay, Kastamonu		
 Eceoğlu, Kastamonu		
 Elmayakası, Kastamonu		
 Emir, Kastamonu
 Emirler, Kastamonu
 Emirle-Kuzkaya, Kastamonu
 Emirli, Kastamonu		
 Esenler, Kastamonu		
 Esenli, Kastamonu		
 Eşen, Kastamonu		
 Etyemez, Kastamonu		
 Evciler, Kastamonu		
 Eymir, Kastamonu		
 Gelinören, Kastamonu		
 Geyikli, Kastamonu		
 Girdallı, Kastamonu		
 Göcen, Kastamonu		
 Gödel, Kastamonu		
 Gökçekent, Kastamonu		
 Gökçukur, Kastamonu		
 Gölköy, Kastamonu		
 Gömeç, Kastamonu		
 Gömmece, Kastamonu		
 Gülef, Kastamonu		
 Hacı, Kastamonu
 Hacıbey, Kastamonu		
 Hacıilyas, Kastamonu		
 Hacımuharrem, Kastamonu		
 Hacışaban, Kastamonu		
 Hacıyusuf, Kastamonu		
 Halaçlı, Kastamonu		
 Halife, Kastamonu		
 Halifekuyucağı, Kastamonu		
 Hamit, Kastamonu
 Has, Kastamonu
 Hatıp, Kastamonu
 Hatipli, Kastamonu		
 Hatipoğlu, Kastamonu		
 Haydarlar, Kastamonu		
 Hoca, Kastamonu
 Hüseyinli, Kastamonu		
 İbişler, Kastamonu		
 İbrahimli, Kastamonu		
 İmamköy, Kastamonu		
 İnceboğaz, Kastamonu		
 İslam, Kastamonu
 İsmailli-Akkaya, Kastamonu
 İsmailli-Kuzkaya, Kastamonu
 Kadıoğlu, Kastamonu		
 Karaçomak, Kastamonu		
 Karaevli, Kastamonu		
 Karakuz, Kastamonu		
 Karamukmolla, Kastamonu		
 Karaş, Kastamonu		
 Kasaba, Kastamonu		
 Kasabaörencik, Kastamonu		
 Kaşçılar, Kastamonu		
 Kavak, Kastamonu
 Kavalca, Kastamonu		
 Kayalı, Kastamonu		
 Kayı, Kastamonu		
 Kemerler, Kastamonu		
 Keremli, Kastamonu		
 Kırcalar, Kastamonu		
 Kırık, Kastamonu		
 Kırışoğlu, Kastamonu		
 Kızılkese, Kastamonu		
 Kirenli, Kastamonu		
 Konukça, Kastamonu		
 Koru, Kastamonu
 Köklü, Kastamonu		
 Köseoğlu, Kastamonu		
 Kurtgömeç, Kastamonu		
 Kurtkayı, Kastamonu		
 Kurucaören, Kastamonu		
 Kurusaray, Kastamonu		
 Kuşkara, Kastamonu		
 Kuzyaka, Kastamonu
 Kıyık (Kuzkaya), Kastamonu
 Küçüksu, Kastamonu		
 Kıyık, Kastamonu		
 Kıyık-Kuzkaya, Kastamonu
 Mescit, Kastamonu
 Molla, Kastamonu
 Musallar, Kastamonu		
 Nalcıkuyucağı, Kastamonu		
 Numanlar, Kastamonu		
 Obruk, Kastamonu		
 Oğul, Kastamonu
 Omcular, Kastamonu		
 Orta, Kastamonu
 Ortaboğaz, Kastamonu		
 Ömerli, Kastamonu		
 Örencik, Kastamonu		
 Örenyeri, Kastamonu		
 Pehlivan, Kastamonu
 Sada, Kastamonu		
 Sahip, Kastamonu		
 Sapaca, Kastamonu		
 Saraycık, Kastamonu		
 Sarıca, Kastamonu		
 Sarıömer, Kastamonu		
 Seremittin, Kastamonu
 Sırasöğütler, Kastamonu		
 Sipahi, Kastamonu		
 Subaşı, Kastamonu		
 Sulusökü, Kastamonu		
 Şeyh, Kastamonu
 Talipler, Kastamonu		
 Tarlatepe, Kastamonu		
 Taşlık, Kastamonu		
 Tekke, Kastamonu
 Tepeharman, Kastamonu		
 Terzi, Kastamonu
 Uzunoluk, Kastamonu		
 Ümit, Kastamonu		
 Üyücek, Kastamonu		
 Yaka, Kastamonu		
 Yarören, Kastamonu		
 Yenikavak, Kastamonu		
 Yılancı, Kastamonu		
 Yolkonak, Kastamonu		
 Yukarıbatak, Kastamonu		
 Yukarıelyakut, Kastamonu		
 Yukarıkuyucak, Kastamonu		
 Yunus, Kastamonu
 Yürekveren, Kastamonu

Abana
 Abana
 Akçam, Abana		
 Altıkulaç, Abana		
 Çampınar, Abana		
 Denizbükü, Abana		
 Elmaçukuru, Abana		
 Göynükler, Abana		
 Kadıyusuf, Abana		
 Yakabaşı, Abana		
 Yemeni, Abana		
 Yeşilyuva, Abana

Ağlı
Ağlı
Adalar, Ağlı		
Akçakese, Ağlı		
Akdivan, Ağlı		
Bereketli, Ağlı		
Fırıncık, Ağlı
Gölcüğez, Ağlı
Kabacı, Ağlı
Müsellimler, Ağlı
Oluközü, Ağlı
Selmanlı, Ağlı
Tunuslar, Ağlı
Turnacık, Ağlı
Yeşilpınar, Ağlı

Araç
 Araç
 Ahatlar, Araç
 Akgeçit, Araç		
 Akıncılar, Araç
 Aksu, Araç		
 Aktaş, Araç		
 Alakaya, Araç
 Alınören, Araç		
 Aşağıçobanözü, Araç
 Aşağıılıpınar, Araç
 Aşağıikizören, Araç
 Aşağıoba, Araç
 Aşağıyazı, Araç
 Avlacık, Araç		
 Avlağıçayırı, Araç
 Bahçecik, Araç
 Balçıkhisar, Araç		
 Başköy, Araç
 Bektüre, Araç
 Belen, Araç
 Belkavak, Araç		
 Buğdam, Araç		
 Celepler, Araç
 Cevizlik, Araç
 Çalköy, Araç
 Çamaltı, Araç		
 Çavuşköy, Araç		
 Çaykaşı, Araç
 Çerçiler, Araç		
 Çubukludere, Araç		
 Çukurpelit, Araç		
 Damla, Araç		
 Değirmençay, Araç
 Dereçatı, Araç
 Deretepe, Araç
 Doğanca, Araç		
 Doğanpınar, Araç		
 Doruk, Araç
 Ekinözü, Araç
 Erekli, Araç		
 Eskiiğdir, Araç		
 Fındıklı, Araç
 Gemi, Araç		
 Gergen, Araç		
 Gökçeçat, Araç		
 Gökçesu, Araç
 Gölcük, Araç
 Gülükler, Araç		
 Güzelce, Araç
 Güzlük, Araç		
 Haliloba, Araç
 Hanözü, Araç		
 Hatip, Araç
 Huruçören, Araç
 İğdir, Araç
 İğdirkışla, Araç
 İhsanlı, Araç		
 Karacık, Araç		
 Karaçalar, Araç		
 Karakaya, Araç		
 Karcılar, Araç
 Kavacık, Araç
 Kavak, Araç
 Kayabaşı, Araç		
 Kayaboğazı, Araç
 Kayaören, Araç		
 Kemerler, Araç		
 Kışlaköy, Araç		
 Kıyan, Araç		
 Kıyıdibi, Araç
 Kızılören, Araç		
 Kızılsaray, Araç		
 Kirazlı, Araç		
 Kovanlı, Araç
 Köklüdere, Araç		
 Köklüyurt, Araç
 Köse, Araç
 Muratlı, Araç		
 Müslimler, Araç		
 Okçular, Araç
 Okluk, Araç
 Oycalı, Araç		
 Ömersin, Araç		
 Özbel, Araç		
 Palazlar, Araç		
 Pelitören, Araç
 Pınarören, Araç
 Recepbey, Araç		
 Saltuklu, Araç
 Samatlar, Araç
 Sarıhacı, Araç
 Sarpun, Araç
 Serdar, Araç		
 Sıragömü, Araç
 Sofcular, Araç
 Susuz, Araç		
 Sümenler, Araç
 Şehrimanlar, Araç		
 Şenyurt, Araç
 Şiringüney, Araç
 Taşpınar, Araç
 Tatlıca, Araç
 Tavşanlı, Araç
 Tellikoz, Araç		
 Terke, Araç
 Tokatlı, Araç		
 Toygaören, Araç		
 Tuzaklı, Araç		
 Uğur, Araç
 Ulucak, Araç		
 Üçpınar, Araç		
 Yenice, Araç
 Yeşilova, Araç
 Yukarıçobanözü, Araç
 Yukarıgüney, Araç
 Yukarıılıpınar, Araç
 Yukarıikizören, Araç
 Yukarıoba, Araç
 Yukarıyazı, Araç		
 Yurttepe, Araç

Azdavay
 Azdavay
 Ahat, Azdavay		
 Akcaçam, Azdavay
 Alacık, Azdavay
 Aliköy, Azdavay		
 Arslanca, Azdavay
 Bakırcı, Azdavay		
 Başakçay, Azdavay
 Başören, Azdavay
 Çakıroğlu, Azdavay		
 Çamlıbük, Azdavay
 Çoçukören, Azdavay
 Çömlektepe, Azdavay
 Derelitekke, Azdavay
 Dereyücek, Azdavay
 Evlek, Azdavay
 Gecen, Azdavay
 Göktaş, Azdavay		
 Gültepe, Azdavay
 Gümürtler, Azdavay
 Hıdırlar, Azdavay
 Hocaköy, Azdavay		
 Kanlıdağ, Azdavay		
 Karahalılılar, Azdavay		
 Karakuşlu, Azdavay
 Kayabaşı, Azdavay
 Kayaoğlu, Azdavay
 Kerpiçlik, Azdavay
 Kırcalar, Azdavay		
 Kırmacı, Azdavay
 Kolca, Azdavay
 Kozluören, Azdavay		
 Kurtçular, Azdavay
 Maden, Azdavay
 Maksutköy, Azdavay		
 Mehmetçelebi, Azdavay
 Sabuncular, Azdavay
 Sada, Azdavay
 Samancı, Azdavay
 Sarayköy, Azdavay
 Sarnıçköy, Azdavay
 Sıraköy, Azdavay
 Söğütpınar, Azdavay
 Tasköy, Azdavay
 Tomrukköy, Azdavay
 Topuk, Azdavay
 Üyük, Azdavay
 Yeşilköy, Azdavay
 Yumacık, Azdavay
 Zümrüt, Azdavay

Bozkurt
 Bozkurt
 Alantepe, Bozkurt
 Ambarcılar, Bozkurt
 Bayramgazi, Bozkurt
 Beldeğirmen, Bozkurt
 Çiçekyayla, Bozkurt
 Darsu, Bozkurt
 Dursun, Bozkurt
 Görentaş, Bozkurt
 Güngören, Bozkurt
 Günvaktı, Bozkurt
 Işığan, Bozkurt
 İbrahim, Bozkurt
 İlişi, Bozkurt
 İnceyazı, Bozkurt
 Kayalar, Bozkurt
 Kestanesökü, Bozkurt
 Keşlik, Bozkurt
 Kızılcaelma, Bozkurt
 Kirazsökü, Bozkurt
 Kocaçam, Bozkurt
 Koşmapınar, Bozkurt
 Köseali, Bozkurt
 Kutluca, Bozkurt
 Mamatlar, Bozkurt
 Ortasökü, Bozkurt
 Sakızcılar, Bozkurt
 Sarıçiçek, Bozkurt
 Şeyhoğlu, Bozkurt
 Tezcan, Bozkurt
 Ulu, Bozkurt
 Yaşarlı, Bozkurt
 Yaylatepe, Bozkurt

Cide
 Cide
 Abdulkadir, Cide
 Ağaçbükü, Cide		
 Akbayır, Cide		
 Akça, Cide
 Alayazı, Cide
 Alayüz, Cide		
 Aydıncık, Cide
 Baltacı, Cide
 Başköy, Cide		
 Beltepe, Cide
 Beşevler, Cide
 Çakırlı, Cide
 Çamaltı, Cide		
 Çamdibi, Cide
 Çataloluk, Cide
 Çayüstü, Cide
 Çayyaka, Cide
 Çilekçe, Cide		
 Çukurçal, Cide		
 Denizkonak, Cide
 Derebağ, Cide
 Derebucağı, Cide		
 Doğankaya, Cide
 Döngelce, Cide		
 Düzköy, Cide
 Emirler, Cide		
 Gebeş, Cide
 Gökçeler, Cide
 Gökçeören, Cide		
 Gündoğan, Cide		
 Günebakan, Cide
 Güzelyayla, Cide
 Hacıahmet, Cide
 Hamitli, Cide
 Himmetbeşe, Cide
 İlyasbey, Cide
 Irmakköy, Cide
 İsaköy, Cide
 İshakça, Cide		
 Kalafat, Cide		
 Kapısuyu, Cide		
 Karakadı, Cide		
 Kasımköy, Cide		
 Kayaardı, Cide		
 Kazanlı, Cide		
 Kethüda, Cide		
 Kezağzı, Cide
 Kıranlıkoz, Cide
 Koçlar, Cide
 Konuklar, Cide		
 Kovanören, Cide
 Köseli, Cide		
 Kumköy, Cide		
 Kuşçu, Cide		
 Kuşkayası, Cide
 Mencekli, Cide
 Menük, Cide
 Musaköy, Cide
 Nanepınarı, Cide		
 Okçular, Cide
 Olucak, Cide		
 Ortaca, Cide
 Ovacık, Cide
 Öveçler, Cide		
 Pehlivanlı, Cide		
 Sakallı, Cide
 Sırakaya, Cide
 Sipahi, Cide
 Sofular, Cide
 Soğucak, Cide
 Şenköy, Cide
 Tarakçı, Cide		
 Toygarlı, Cide
 Uğurlu, Cide
 Üçağıl, Cide		
 Velioğlu, Cide
 Yalçınköy, Cide
 Yaylaköy, Cide
 Yenice, Cide
 Yeniköy, Cide
 Yıldızalan, Cide		
 Yurtbaşı, Cide

Çatalzeytin
 Çatalzeytin
 Arıca, Çatalzeytin
 Aşağısökü, Çatalzeytin
 Canlar, Çatalzeytin
 Celallar, Çatalzeytin
 Çağlar, Çatalzeytin
 Çatak, Çatalzeytin
 Çepni, Çatalzeytin
 Çubuklu, Çatalzeytin
 Dağköy, Çatalzeytin
 Doğan, Çatalzeytin
 Duran, Çatalzeytin
 Epçeler, Çatalzeytin
 Fındıklı, Çatalzeytin
 Güneşler, Çatalzeytin
 Hacıreis, Çatalzeytin
 Hacıreissökü, Çatalzeytin
 Hamidiye, Çatalzeytin
 İsmail, Çatalzeytin
 Karacakaya, Çatalzeytin
 Kaşlıca, Çatalzeytin
 Kavaklı, Çatalzeytin
 Kavakören, Çatalzeytin
 Kayadibi, Çatalzeytin
 Kaymazlar, Çatalzeytin
 Kızılcakaya, Çatalzeytin
 Kirazlı, Çatalzeytin
 Konaklı, Çatalzeytin
 Köklüce, Çatalzeytin
 Kuğu, Çatalzeytin
 Kulfallar, Çatalzeytin
 Kuzsökü, Çatalzeytin
 Paşalı, Çatalzeytin
 Piri, Çatalzeytin
 Samancı, Çatalzeytin
 Saraçlar, Çatalzeytin
 Sırakonak, Çatalzeytin
 Sökü, Çatalzeytin
 Yemişli, Çatalzeytin
 Yenibeyler, Çatalzeytin
 Yukarısökü, Çatalzeytin
 Yunuslar, Çatalzeytin

Daday
 Daday
 Akılçalman, Daday		
 Akpınar, Daday		
 Aktaştekke, Daday		
 Alipaşa, Daday		
 Arabacılar, Daday		
 Bağışlar, Daday		
 Bastak, Daday		
 Bayırköy, Daday		
 Bayramlı, Daday		
 Beykoz, Daday		
 Bezirgan, Daday		
 Bolatlar, Daday		
 Boyalıca, Daday		
 Boyalılar, Daday		
 Budaklı, Daday		
 Çamkonak, Daday		
 Çamlıbel, Daday		
 Çavuşlu, Daday		
 Çayırlı, Daday		
 Çayözü, Daday		
 Çölmekçiler, Daday		
 Davutköy, Daday		
 Değirmencik, Daday		
 Değirmenözü, Daday		
 Demirce, Daday		
 Dereköy, Daday		
 Dereözü, Daday		
 Elmayazı, Daday		
 Ertaş, Daday		
 Fasıllar, Daday		
 Gökören, Daday		
 Görük, Daday		
 Hasanağa, Daday		
 Hasanşeyh, Daday		
 İnciğez, Daday		
 Kapaklı, Daday		
 Karaağaç, Daday		
 Karacaağaç, Daday		
 Karacaören, Daday		
 Karamık, Daday		
 Kavakyayla, Daday		
 Kayabağı, Daday		
 Kayı, Daday		
 Kızılörencik, Daday		
 Kızsini, Daday		
 Koççuğaz, Daday		
 Köşeler, Daday		
 Küten, Daday		
 Okluk, Daday		
 Örencik, Daday		
 Sarıçam, Daday		
 Sarpun, Daday		
 Selalmaz, Daday		
 Siyahlar, Daday		
 Sorkun, Daday		
 Sorkuncuk, Daday		
 Tüfekçi, Daday		
 Uzbanlar, Daday		
 Üyükören, Daday		
 Yazıcameydan, Daday

Devrekani
 Devrekani
 Ahlatçık, Devrekani		
 Akçapınar, Devrekani		
 Akdoğan, Devrekani		
 Akmescit, Devrekani		
 Alaçay, Devrekani		
 Alçılar, Devrekani		
 Alınören, Devrekani		
 Arslanbey, Devrekani		
 Asarcık, Devrekani		
 Balabanlar, Devrekani
 Baltacak, Devrekani
 Başakpınar, Devrekani
 Başakpınartepe, Devrekani
 Belovacık, Devrekani
 Bıngıldayık, Devrekani
 Bozarmut, Devrekani
 Bozkoca, Devrekani
 Bozkocatepe, Devrekani
 Çatak, Devrekani
 Çavuşlu, Devrekani
 Çontay, Devrekani
 Çorbacı, Devrekani
 Çörekçi, Devrekani
 Doğuörcünler, Devrekani
 Elmalıtekke, Devrekani
 Erenler, Devrekani
 Fakılar, Devrekani
 Göynükören, Devrekani
 Habeşli, Devrekani
 Hasırlı, Devrekani
 İnciğez, Devrekani
 Kadıoğlu, Devrekani
 Kanlıabat, Devrekani
 Karaçam, Devrekani
 Karayazıcılar, Devrekani
 Kasaplar, Devrekani
 Kınık, Devrekani
 Kızacık, Devrekani
 Kurtköy, Devrekani
 Kuzköy, Devrekani
 Laçin, Devrekani
 Örenbaşı, Devrekani
 Pınarözü, Devrekani
 Saraydurak, Devrekani
 Sarıyonca, Devrekani
 Sarpunalınca, Devrekani
 Selahattinköy, Devrekani
 Sinantekke, Devrekani
 Şenlik, Devrekani
 Şeyhbali, Devrekani
 Tekkekızıllar, Devrekani
 Ulamış, Devrekani
 Yazıbelen, Devrekani
 Yazıhisar, Devrekani

Doğanyurt
 Doğanyurt
 Akçabel, Doğanyurt
 Aşağımescit, Doğanyurt
 Baldıran, Doğanyurt
 Başköy, Doğanyurt
 Belyaka, Doğanyurt
 Boğazcık, Doğanyurt
 Çakırlı, Doğanyurt
 Danışman, Doğanyurt
 Demirci, Doğanyurt
 Denizbükü, Doğanyurt
 Denizgörülen, Doğanyurt
 Düz, Doğanyurt
 Düzağaç, Doğanyurt
 Gökçe, Doğanyurt
 Gözalan, Doğanyurt
 Gürmüdü, Doğanyurt
 Haskavak, Doğanyurt
 Kayran, Doğanyurt
 Köfünanbarı, Doğanyurt
 Küçüktepe, Doğanyurt
 Şirin, Doğanyurt
 Taşlıpınar, Doğanyurt
 Yassıkışla, Doğanyurt
 Yukarımescit, Doğanyurt

Hanönü
 Hanönü
 Akçasu, Hanönü
 Bağdere, Hanönü
 Bölükyazı, Hanönü
 Çakırçay, Hanönü
 Çaybaşı, Hanönü
 Demircimüezzin, Hanönü
 Gökbelen, Hanönü
 Gökçeağaç, Hanönü
 Halkabük, Hanönü
 Hocavakıf, Hanönü
 Kavak, Hanönü
 Kayabaşı, Hanönü
 Küreçayı, Hanönü
 Sarıalan, Hanönü
 Sirke, Hanönü
 Yeniboyundurcak, Hanönü
 Yenice, Hanönü
 Yeniköy, Hanönü
 Yılanlı, Hanönü
 Yukarıçakırçay, Hanönü

İhsangazi
 İhsangazi
 Akkaya, İhsangazi
 Akkirpi, İhsangazi
 Bedirgeriş, İhsangazi
 Belençal, İhsangazi
 Bozarmut, İhsangazi
 Çatalyazı, İhsangazi
 Çiçekpınar, İhsangazi
 Dağyolu, İhsangazi
 Enbiya, İhsangazi
 Görpe, İhsangazi
 Haydarlar, İhsangazi
 Hocahacip, İhsangazi
 İnciğez, İhsangazi
 Kapaklı, İhsangazi
 Kayapınar, İhsangazi
 Kızıleller, İhsangazi
 Koçcuğaz, İhsangazi
 Obruk, İhsangazi
 Örencik, İhsangazi
 Sarıpınar, İhsangazi
 Sepetçioğlu, İhsangazi
 Sünlük, İhsangazi
 Yarışlar, İhsangazi

İnebolu
 İnebolu
 Akçay
 Akgüney
 Akkonak
 Aktaş
 Alaca
 Aşağıçaylı
 Atabeyli
 Ayvaköy
 Ayvat
 Başköy
 Bayıralan
 Belen
 Belence
 Belören
 Beyler
 Çamdalı
 Çamlıca
 Çaydüzü
 Çaykıyı
 Çiçekyazı
 Çubuk
 Deliktaş
 Deresökü
 Dibek
 Dikili
 Doğanören
 Durupınar
 Erenyolu
 Erkekarpa
 Esenyurt
 Gemiciler
 Göçkün
 Gökbel
 Gökçevre
 Güde
 Güneşli
 Hacıibrahim
 Hacımehmet
 Hamitköy
 Hayrioğlu
 Hörmetli
 İkiyaka
 İkizler
 Kabalar
 Kabalarsökü
 Karabey
 Karşıyaka
 Kayaelması
 Keloğlu
 Korupınar
 Köroğlu
 Köseköy
 Kuzluk
 Musaköy
 Örtülü
 Özbaşı
 Özlüce
 Sakalar
 Salıcıoğlu
 Soğukpınar
 Sökü
 Şamalı
 Şamaoğlu
 Şeyhömer
 Taşburun
 Taşoluk
 Toklukaya
 Uğrak
 Uluköy
 Uluyol
 Üçevler
 Üçlüce
 Yakaboyu
 Yamaç
 Yaztepe
 Yeşilöz
 Yolüstü
 Yukarıçaylı
 Yukarıköy
 Yunusköy
 Yuvacık

Küre
 Küre
 Afşargüney, Küre
 Afşarimam, Küre
 Ahmetbeşe, Küre
 Alacık, Küre
 Avcıpınarı, Küre
 Belören, Küre
 Beşören, Küre
 Beyalan, Küre
 Bürüm, Küre
 Camili, Küre
 Canbaz, Küre
 Çat, Küre
 Çatak, Küre
 Çaybükü, Küre
 Ersizler, Küre
 Ersizlerdere, Küre
 Güllüce, Küre
 Güney, Küre
 İğdir, Küre
 İkizçiler, Küre
 İmralı, Küre
 Karadonu, Küre
 Karaman, Küre
 Kayadibi, Küre
 Kesepınar, Küre
 Koyunkırtık, Küre
 Kozköy, Küre
 Kösreli, Küre
 Köstekçiler, Küre
 Sarpun, Küre
 Sipahiler, Küre
 Taşpınar, Küre
 Topçu, Küre
 Uzunöz, Küre

Pınarbaşı
 Pınarbaşı
 Aşağıaktaş, Pınarbaşı
 Başköy, Pınarbaşı
 Boğazkaya, Pınarbaşı
 Çavuşköy, Pınarbaşı
 Çengel, Pınarbaşı
 Demirtaş, Pınarbaşı
 Dizdarlı, Pınarbaşı
 Esentepe, Pınarbaşı
 Günberi, Pınarbaşı
 Hocalar, Pınarbaşı
 Ilıca, Pınarbaşı
 Kalaycı, Pınarbaşı
 Kapancı, Pınarbaşı
 Karacaören, Pınarbaşı
 Karafasıl, Pınarbaşı
 Kayabükü, Pınarbaşı
 Kerte, Pınarbaşı
 Kurtlugelik, Pınarbaşı
 Mirahor, Pınarbaşı
 Muratbaşı, Pınarbaşı
 Savaş, Pınarbaşı
 Sümenler, Pınarbaşı
 Urva, Pınarbaşı
 Uzla, Pınarbaşı
 Üyükören, Pınarbaşı
 Yamanlar, Pınarbaşı
 Yukarıaktaş, Pınarbaşı

Seydiler
 Seydiler
 Çerçiler, Sediler
 Çırdak, Sediler
 Çiğilerik, Sediler
 Emreler, Sediler
 Ercek, Sediler
 İmrenler, Sediler
 İncesu, Sediler
 Karaçavuş, Sediler
 Kepez, Sediler
 Mancılık, Sediler
 Odabaşı, Sediler
 Sabuncular, Sediler
 Şalgam, Sediler
 Üyük, Sediler
 Yolyaka, Sediler

Şenpazar
 Şenpazar
 Alancık, Şenpazar
 Aşıklı, Şenpazar
 Aybasan, Şenpazar
 Az.Kalaycı, Şenpazar
 Başçavuş, Şenpazar
 Büyükmutlu, Şenpazar
 Celallı, Şenpazar
 Dağlı, Şenpazar
 Demirkaya, Şenpazar
 Dereköy, Şenpazar
 Dördül, Şenpazar
 Edeler, Şenpazar
 Furuncuk, Şenpazar
 Gürleyik, Şenpazar
 Gürpelit, Şenpazar
 Harmangeriş, Şenpazar
 Himmet, Şenpazar
 Küçükmutlu, Şenpazar
 Salman, Şenpazar
 Sefer, Şenpazar
 Tepecik, Şenpazar
 Uzunyol, Şenpazar
 Yarımca, Şenpazar

Taşköprü
 Taşköprü
 Abay, Taşköprü
 Abdalhasan, Taşköprü
 Afşar, Taşköprü
 Akçakese, Taşköprü
 Akdeğirmen, Taşköprü
 Akdoğan, Taşköprü
 Akdoğantekke, Taşköprü
 Akseki, Taşköprü
 Alamabatak, Taşköprü
 Alamakayış, Taşköprü
 Alamaşişli, Taşköprü
 Alasökü, Taşköprü
 Alatarla, Taşköprü
 Alipaşa, Taşköprü
 Alisaray, Taşköprü
 Armutlu, Taşköprü
 Arslanlı, Taşköprü
 Aşağıçayırcık, Taşköprü
 Aşağıçit, Taşköprü
 Aşağıemerce, Taşköprü
 Aşağışehirören, Taşköprü
 Ayvalı, Taşköprü
 Badembekdemir, Taşköprü
 Bademci, Taşköprü
 Bekdemirekşi, Taşköprü
 Bekirli, Taşköprü
 Beyköy, Taşköprü
 Boyundurcak, Taşköprü
 Bozarmut, Taşköprü
 Böcü, Taşköprü
 Bük, Taşköprü
 Celep, Taşköprü
 Çambaşı, Taşköprü
 Çaycevher, Taşköprü
 Çaykirpi, Taşköprü
 Çaylaklar, Taşköprü
 Çekiç, Taşköprü
 Çetmi, Taşköprü
 Çevik, Taşköprü
 Çiftkıran, Taşköprü
 Çiftlik, Taşköprü
 Çit, Taşköprü
 Çoroğlu, Taşköprü
 Çördük, Taşköprü
 Dağbelören, Taşköprü
 Dere, Taşköprü
 Derebeysibey, Taşköprü
 Derekaraağaç, Taşköprü
 Dilek, Taşköprü
 Donalar, Taşköprü
 Doymuş, Taşköprü
 Duruca, Taşköprü
 Erik, Taşköprü
 Ersil, Taşköprü
 Esenlik, Taşköprü
 Eskiatça, Taşköprü
 Eskioğlu, Taşköprü
 Garipşah, Taşköprü
 Gündoğdu, Taşköprü
 Güneykalınkese, Taşköprü
 Hacıali, Taşköprü
 Hamzaoğlu, Taşköprü
 Hasanlı, Taşköprü
 Hocaköy, Taşköprü
 İmamoğlu, Taşköprü
 İncesu, Taşköprü
 Kabalar, Taşköprü
 Kadıköy, Taşköprü
 Kapaklı, Taşköprü
 Karacakaya, Taşköprü
 Karacaoğlu, Taşköprü
 Karadedeoğlu, Taşköprü
 Karapürçek, Taşköprü
 Karnıaçık, Taşköprü
 Karşı, Taşköprü
 Kayadibi, Taşköprü
 Kayapınar, Taşköprü
 Kaygınca, Taşköprü
 Kese, Taşköprü
 Kılıçlı, Taşköprü
 Kıran, Taşköprü
 Kırha, Taşköprü
 Kızılcaören, Taşköprü
 Kızılcaörhen, Taşköprü
 Kızılkese, Taşköprü
 Kirazcık, Taşköprü
 Koçanlı, Taşköprü
 Kornapa, Taşköprü
 Köçekli, Taşköprü
 Kuyluş, Taşköprü
 Kuzkalınkese, Taşköprü
 Küçüksüq, Taşköprü
 Masatlar, Taşköprü
 Obrucak, Taşköprü
 Olukbaşı, Taşköprü
 Ortaköy, Taşköprü
 Ortaöz, Taşköprü
 Oymaağaçseki, Taşköprü
 Ömerli, Taşköprü
 Örhen, Taşköprü
 Örhenli, Taşköprü
 Paşaköy, Taşköprü
 Pirahmetli, Taşköprü
 Samanlıören, Taşköprü
 Sarıkavak, Taşköprü
 Sarıseki, Taşköprü
 Sarpun, Taşköprü
 Şahinçatı, Taşköprü
 Şehirören, Taşköprü
 Taşçılar, Taşköprü
 Tavukçuoğlu, Taşköprü
 Tekeoğlu, Taşköprü
 Tepedelik, Taşköprü
 Tokaş, Taşköprü
 Urgancı, Taşköprü
 Uzunkavak, Taşköprü
 Vakıfbelören, Taşköprü
 Yavuç, Taşköprü
 Yavuçkuyucağı, Taşköprü
 Yazıhamit, Taşköprü
 Yeniler, Taşköprü
 Yeşilyurt, Taşköprü
 Yoğunoluk, Taşköprü
 Yukarıçayırcık, Taşköprü
 Yukarıemerce, Taşköprü
 Yukarışehirören, Taşköprü

Tosya
 Tosya
 Ahmetoğlu, Tosya
 Akbük, Tosya
 Akseki, Tosya
 Aşağıberçin, Tosya
 Aşağıdikmen, Tosya
 Aşağıkayı, Tosya
 Bayat, Tosya
 Bürnük, Tosya
 Çakırlar, Tosya
 Çaybaşı, Tosya
 Çaykapı, Tosya
 Çeltikçi, Tosya
 Çepni, Tosya
 Çevlik, Tosya
 Çifter, Tosya
 Çukurköy, Tosya
 Dağardı, Tosya
 Dağçatağı, Tosya
 Dedem, Tosya
 Ekincik, Tosya
 Ermelik, Tosya
 Gökçeöz, Tosya
 Gökomuz, Tosya
 Gövrecik, Tosya
 İncebel, Tosya
 Karabey, Tosya
 Karaköy, Tosya
 Karasapaça, Tosya
 Kargın, Tosya
 Kayaönü, Tosya
 Keçeli, Tosya
 Kınık, Tosya
 Kızılca, Tosya
 Kilkuyu, Tosya
 Kösen, Tosya
 Kuşçular, Tosya
 Küçükkızılca, Tosya
 Küçüksekiler, Tosya
 Mısmılağaç, Tosya
 Musaköy, Tosya
 Ortalıca, Tosya
 Özboyu, Tosya
 Sapaca, Tosya
 Sekiler, Tosya
 Sevinçören, Tosya
 Sofular, Tosya
 Suluca, Tosya
 Şarakman, Tosya
 Yağcılar, Tosya
 Yenidoğan, Tosya
 Yukarıberçin, Tosya
 Yukarıdikmen, Tosya
 Yukarıkayı, Tosya
 Zincirlikuyu, Tosya

References

List
Kastamonu